The 27th Annual Screen Actors Guild Awards, honoring the best achievements in film and television performances for the year 2020, were presented on April 4, 2021 at the Shrine Auditorium in Los Angeles, California. The ceremony was broadcast live on both TNT and TBS at 9:00 P.M. EST / 6:00 P.M. PST, airing for one hour rather than the usual two. The nominees were announced by Lily Collins and Daveed Diggs on February 4, 2021 via Instagram Live.

Additionally, the shortened one-hour show was pre-recorded. The winners were informed of their wins a few days before the telecast and the acceptance speeches were also pre-taped. These changes were a COVID-era decision in order to protect the guild's nominees and presenters.

Michael Keaton made history by becoming the first person in SAG history to win three awards for Outstanding Performance by a Cast in a Motion Picture, winning this year for The Trial of the Chicago 7. In 2015 and 2016, he was part of the winning ensembles for Birdman (2014) and Spotlight (2015), respectively.

Chadwick Boseman tied Jamie Foxx and Maggie Smith in the record for most nominations in a single ceremony with four: Outstanding Performance by a Male Actor in a Leading Role for Ma Rainey's Black Bottom, Outstanding Performance by a Male Actor in a Supporting Role for Da 5 Bloods, and as part of the ensembles of both films for Outstanding Performance by a Cast in a Motion Picture. Boseman ultimately won for Outstanding Performance by a Male Actor in a Leading Role, making history as the first actor to win the category posthumously; his widow, Taylor Simone Ledward, accepted the award.

The ceremony also marked the first time that all four individual film acting categories were won by people of color.

Winners and nominees
 Note: Winners are listed first and highlighted in boldface.

Film

Television

In Memoriam
The segment honored the following who died in 2020 and early 2021:

 Cloris Leachman
 Thomas Jefferson Byrd
 Carl Reiner
 Dawn Wells
 Ja'Net DuBois
 Shirley Knight
 Max von Sydow
 Joyce Gordon
 Ian Holm
 Conchata Ferrell
 Irrfan Khan
 Naya Rivera
 Hal Holbrook
 Yaphet Kotto
 John Karlen
 Henry Darrow
 Warren Berlinger
 Fred Willard
 Jerry Stiller
 Natalie Desselle-Reid
 Kelly Preston
 Lyle Waggoner
 Zoe Caldwell
 Kellye Nakahara
 Ann Reinking
 Richard Herd
 Tommy Lister Jr.
 John Saxon
 Diana Rigg
 Ben Cross
 Olivia de Havilland
 Brian Dennehy
 Sean Connery
 George Segal
 Robert Conrad
 Honor Blackman
 Gregory Sierra
 Tanya Roberts
 David L. Lander
 Christopher Plummer
 Mark Blum
 Deezer D
 Mac Davis
 Bruce Kirby
 Lynn Cohen
 Orson Bean
 Kevin Dobson
 Dustin Diamond
 Jessica Walter
 Nick Cordero
 Peter Mark Richman
 Wilford Brimley
 Cicely Tyson
 Kirk Douglas
 Chadwick Boseman

Presenters
The following individuals presented awards at the ceremony:

 Mindy Kaling with Outstanding Performance by a Male Actor in a Television Movie or Limited Series
 Riz Ahmed with Outstanding Performance by a Female Actor in a Television Movie or Limited Series
 Daveed Diggs with Outstanding Performance by a Male Actor in a Comedy Series
 Rita Moreno with Outstanding Performance by a Female Actor in a Comedy Series
 Jimmy Fallon with Outstanding Performance by an Ensemble in a Comedy Series
 Gabrielle Carteris presented SAG-AFTRA
 Cynthia Erivo with Outstanding Performance by a Male Actor in a Supporting Role
 Henry Golding with Outstanding Performance by a Female Actor in a Supporting Role
 Viola Davis presented "In Memoriam" segment
 Common with Outstanding Performance by a Female Actor in a Drama Series
 Lily Collins with Outstanding Performance by a Male Actor in a Drama Series
 Dan Levy with Outstanding Performance by an Ensemble in a Drama Series
 Ethan Hawke with Outstanding Performance by a Female Actor in a Leading Role
 Daisy Ridley with Outstanding Performance by a Male Actor in a Leading Role
 Helen Mirren with Outstanding Performance by a Cast in a Motion Picture

References

External links
 

2020
Screen
2020 in American cinema
2020 in American television
Screen
2021 in Los Angeles
April 2021 events in the United States
2021 awards in the United States
Impact of the COVID-19 pandemic on cinema
Impact of the COVID-19 pandemic on television